Vidiator was a fully owned subsidiary of Hutchison Whampoa, founded by Connie Wong in 2002 to provide 3G video products to the Hutchison 3 group. The company's last president and CEO was Tae Sung Park who joined in 2009. Vidiator had offices in Hong Kong (headquarters), Seattle and London.

Vidiator's streaming and encoding platforms were media player agnostic and supported the most requested video and audio codecs at the time. Vidiator has also pioneered the live streaming of TV, music, live concerts, horse racing, awards ceremonies and major sporting events.

References

Vidiator's Xenon Encoder to Support NTT DoCoMo's i-motion Services

Information technology companies of the United States
Companies established in 2002
Companies based in Washington (state)